Shiluvana is a settlement in Mopani District Municipality in the Limpopo province of South Africa.
It is the birthplace of Hudson William Edison Ntsanwisi, the former Chief Minister of the Gazankulu bantustan, whose parents' graves are also in Shiluvana village.. It is also the birthplace of actor and businessman Fumani Shilubana.

References

Populated places in the Greater Tzaneen Local Municipality